The r rotunda ⟨ ꝛ ⟩, "rounded r", is a historical calligraphic variant of the minuscule (lowercase) letter Latin r used in full script-like typefaces, especially blackletters.

In this way, it is comparable to numerous other  special types used for ligatures or conjoined letters in early modern typesetting.

Form 

This symbol came in several different shapes, all of which were of x-height. 
The shape of the letter used in blackletter scripts Textualis as well as Rotunda is reminiscent of "half an r", namely, the right side of the Roman capital ; it looks similar to an Arabic numeral .

Like minuscules in general, the origins of the letter are in cursive writing as it was common during the medieval period, ultimately derived from scribal practice during Late Antiquity.

The r rotunda shape of cursive  resembling the numeral  is also found in a number of medieval scribal abbreviations containing , for example in the signs for the Latin word-final syllables 
ram, -orum and -arum.

There are variant forms for the r rotunda glyph.

Also found in Textura manuscripts is a very narrow second variant, in the form of one solid diamond atop another atop a vertical stroke.
It can be found used as the second  of a pair and after .
A fifth form, used in the 18th century in some French italic typefaces, was a derivative either of the Schrift form of the minuscule  or of similar typefaces used elsewhere. Its form was of a backwards  set just after the same shape rotated 180 degrees. They were separated by a space smaller than the stroke width between them, and the whole character was slanted as though it were cursive. As this typeface had the  that curved to the left, it was used after that character as well. By then, though, the character was the same width as a regular  so it was maintained because it appeared to its users to have some elegance or to remind them of prestigious old calligraphy.

Use for Tironian et

Later, when typesets no longer contained a sort for the Tironian et, it became common practice to use the r rotunda glyph instead, setting  for etc.

Demise 

Use of the letter form was never widespread except in blackletter scripts and so it fell out of use in English in the 16th century as roman scripts became predominant. Modern cursive scripts use a letter  that has a resemblance to the r rotunda.

Encoding

The letter was proposed to be added to Unicode in 2005, in the Latin Extended-D block. As per Unicode 5.1, although there seems to be no real evidence for the historical existence of a capital version and a normal capital R seems to have been used instead.

Before, the Medieval Unicode Font Initiative (MUFI) had allocated it in the Private Use Area (PUA) of medievalist fonts at U+F20E and U+F22D. Since the characters are available in Unicode, MUFI recommends that the Unicode code points be used, not the PUA code points.

Open Type 'hist', 'hlig', 'calt', 'salt' or 'ss**'.

Latin Extended-D also has characters for medieval scribal abbreviations. Among them is the abbreviation for the syllable rum, consisting of a  r rotunda with a cut, resulting in a shape very similar to the astrological symbol for Jupiter .

See also
 Long s

References

External links 
 

Blackletter
Typography
Palaeographic letters